John James Knowlton was a member of the Wisconsin State Assembly.

Biography
Knowlton was born on July 17, 1841 in Wales, New York. During the American Civil War, he served with the 29th Wisconsin Volunteer Infantry Regiment of the Union Army. He died of stomach cancer and complications on May 9, 1903.

Political career

Knowlton was a member of the Assembly during the 1876 and 1877 sessions as an Independent Democrat. Other position he held include Chairman, similar to Mayor, of Seymour, Outagamie County, Wisconsin in 1870 and from 1872 to 1875 and Butte, Montana City Councilman.

References

People from Wales, New York
People from Seymour, Wisconsin
Politicians from Butte, Montana
Montana city council members
Members of the Wisconsin State Assembly
Mayors of places in Wisconsin
People of Wisconsin in the American Civil War
Union Army soldiers
1841 births
1903 deaths
Deaths from stomach cancer
19th-century American politicians